Portrait Of Narcissus is the third solo album by David Wolfenberger. It was released in 2006 on Fundamental Records with Blue Jordan Records as an imprint. The album contains 12 original tracks and features such notables as Victoria Williams on vocals, Michelle Shocked on vocals, Joshua Seurkamp on drums, Kim Taylor on vocals and Joshua Grange on pedal steel guitar. Victoria Williams also painted the portrait of Wolfenberger that is on the cover and inside the album.
It was well received by British and European critics and ended up at #12 on the independent Euro Americana Chart for April 2006

Songs
 Something's Gotta Give
 Freezin' Walt Disney Blues
 Inconsolably Overjoyed
 Parking Lot Martyrs
 Vespa Girl
 See The Evening Star
 Cicada Summer
 Ferris Wheel
 Portrait Of Narcissus
 The Wreck Election
 When Everything Is Over
 Sad, Lonely, Rotten World

References

External links
 David Wolfenberger Website
 Fundamental Records Website

2006 albums